UNM or unm may refer to:

 Monegasque National Union, or Union Nationale Monégasque, a Monegasque political list
 Unami language's ISO 639-3 code
 United National Movement (Georgia) (Ertiani Natsionaluri Modzraoba), a political organization in the country Georgia
 Universidad Nacional de México, former name of the National Autonomous University of Mexico (Universidad Nacional Autónoma de México) in Mexico City
 University of New Mexico, a state university in New Mexico in the United States
 Unum, Chattanooga, Tennessee-based insurance company